Below are lists of former street names in Edinburgh, Scotland, United Kingdom. This is a compilation of lost, renamed or relocated streets in Edinburgh. The degree of preservation of the city, in combination with its status as the home of many famous persons, renders the list worthwhile. The many narrow closes lost and gained over the centuries are excluded.

Demolished
In most cities, this list would be too huge to contemplate. Given Edinburgh's restricted redevelopment in relation to other cities, the list is manageable (only including redevelopment which included loss of full streets).

Argyll Square - demolished to create Royal Museum, Chambers Street
Arthur Street - demolished in the early 60s. Was once the steepest street in Edinburgh
Brown Square - demolished for George IV Bridge, Chambers Street and Museum of Scotland
Canal Street - demolished to create Waverley Station
Cannon Street - demolished to create Leith Fort development in 1950s
Craigside Place - demolished to build Dumbiedykes
Gilmore Street - demolished for extension to Waverley Station
Helen Place - demolished to create Leith Fort development in 1950s
Leith Wynd - north end demolished to create Waverley Station south end demolished to form Jeffrey St
London Row - demolished to create Leith Fort development in 1960s
Luckenbooths - demolished to allow free access around St Giles Cathedral
McDowall Street - demolished for extension to Waverley Station
Park Place - demolished to build the university's medical school on Bristo Street
Salisbury Square, Salisbury Street - demolished same time as Arthur Street
Shakespeare Square - demolished to create GPO/ Waterloo Place
Swinton Row - demolished to create the St James Centre
Victoria Place, Newhaven - demolished as part of the redevelopment of Newhaven.

Renamed
Absorption of outer towns such as Leith and Portobello in  the 1920s necessitated a renaming of several streets due to duplication. Duplicates are marked (D). Individual building projects which were given unique names were often renamed for simplicity when lying on major arterial roads such as Leith Walk or Morningside Road. Some renamings are adjustments rather than full renaming.

Albany Street, Leith - now Portland Street (D)
Archibald Place, Leith - now West Bowling Green Street (D)
Bank Place, Leith - now part of Ferry Road
Bath Street, Leith - now Salamander Place (D)
Braid Place, Sciennes - now Sciennes House Place
Bridge Street, Leith - now Sandport Place
Canary Side - now part of Buccleuch Street
Cassels Place - now addressed as part of Leith Walk.
Castle Barns - now part of Morrison Street
Catherine Street - now Leith Street
Charlotte Street, Leith - now Queen Charlotte Street (D)
Church Lane - now Newbattle Terrace (D)
Dove Loan - merged with Albert Terrace
Duncan Street - now Dundonald Street (D)
Duke Street - added to Dublin Street (D)
Eldin Street - now Adam Street
Fife Place - now part of Leith Walk
George Place - now part of Leith Walk
George Street, Leith - now part of North Fort Street (N)
Graham Street (off Lauriston Place) - renamed as an extension of Keir Street in 1922
Greenhill Bank - now part of Morningside Road
Hope Street, Leith - now Casselbank Street
Jamaica Street, Leith - now part of Ferry Road (D)
James Street (originally St James Street) - now Spey Terrace
John Place, Leith - now Johns Place
Kings Place - now part of Leith Walk
Kings Stables - now Kings Stables Road
Lady Lawsons Wynd - now Lady Lawson Street
Lower Calton - now Calton Road
McNeill Place - now part of Leith Walk
Maitland Street, Newhaven - now part of Newhaven Main Street (D)
Marmion Terrace - now part of Morningside Road
Merchiston Bank - now part of Tipperlinn Road
Moray Street - now Spey Street (to avoid confusion with Moray Place)
Morningside Bank - now part of Morningside Road
Morton Street, Leith - now Academy Street
Niddrie Road - now Duddingston Park South
North Back of Canongate - now Calton Road
Nottingham Place/Terrace - now Greenside Row
Orchardfield Street, Tollcross - now part of Bread Street
Pilrig Place - now part of Leith Walk (one small section still retains the original name)
Pitt Street - added to Dundas Street (D)
Portland Place, Tollcross - now Lauriston Place (D)
Queen's Crescent, Blackhall - now Queen's Avenue South (D)
Queens Place, Leith - now part of Leith Walk
Queen Street, Leith - now Shore Place (D)
Regent Street - now Prince Regent Street to avoid confusion with Regent Road
Register Street - now James Craig Walk
Rosslyn Street - now Rosslyn Crescent
Southfield Avenue, Drum Brae - now Barntongate Avenue
Southfield Drive, Drum Brae - now Barntongate Drive
Southfield Terrace, Drum Brae - now Barntongate Terrace (D)
St Bernard St - now Bernard Street
St Giles Street, Leith -now Giles Street (D)
St Ninians Lane - now Quayside Street (D)
South Back of Canongate - now Holyrood Road
Thomsons Place, Leith - now part of Duke Street
Tobago Street - now part of Morrison Street
Water Gate - now part of the Canongate
Water Lane - now Water Street
Waverley Terrace - now part of Morningside Road
Wellington Street, Leith - now Dudley Avenue South
Wharton Place - now part of Lauriston Place
Wilton Terrace - now part of Tipperlinn Road

Relocated
The City of Edinburgh Council sometimes revitalises old street names, rather than finding a new name (and this is often the preference). However, these new streets are often not in the exact location as originally found, which can be very confusing to genealogists.

Orchardfield - formerly a terrace on Leith Walk, now a modern estate behind its former location
Teviot Row - this name used to link to the area now known as Bristo Street - the name has jumped southwards to the south side of McEwan Hall
Riego Street - this historic name was reused considerably to the east of its former location
Steads Place - originally a section on Leith Walk, now a side street off Leith Walk

References

Former
History of Edinburgh
Edinburgh-related lists
Edinburgh, former
Edinburgh